Four ships of the Royal Navy have been named HMS Parthian, after the ancient Iranic inhabitants of the Parthian Empire. Another was planned but never completed:

  was a 10-gun  launched in 1808 and wrecked on the coast of Egypt on 15 May 1828.
 HMS Parthian was to have been a wooden screw gunvessel ordered in 1846, with the order being cancelled in 1849.
  was a wooden gunboat launched in 1856 and broken up in 1864.
  was an  launched in 1916 and sold for scrapping in 1921.
  was a  launched in 1929, and sunk in 1943.

References

Royal Navy ship names